Debbie Johnsey (born 3 July 1957) is a British equestrian. She competed in two events at the 1976 Summer Olympics.

References

External links
 

1957 births
Living people
British female equestrians
Olympic equestrians of Great Britain
Welsh equestrians
Equestrians at the 1976 Summer Olympics